Franz von Holzhausen (born May 10, 1968) is an American vehicle designer. Since 2008, he has been in charge of design at Tesla, Inc. He led design for the Tesla Model S, Model 3, Model X, Model Y, and Semi, and the unveiled but not-yet-released Cybertruck and second-generation Tesla Roadster.  Prior to Tesla, he worked in design at Mazda, General Motors, and Volkswagen.

Career
In 1992, Holzhausen started his career with Volkswagen, where he worked on the designs for the Microbus and the New Beetle concept project, known as "Concept One," under design lead J Mays.

In 2000, he moved to General Motors as a design manager where he worked on the Saturn Sky and Pontiac Solstice.

In 2005, he took a role at Mazda, where he was chief of design. He led the designs of the Mazda Kabura concept car that debuted at the 2006 North American International Auto Show and of the Mazda Furai concept car that was unveiled at the 2008 North American International Auto Show, both in Detroit.

In 2008, he went to work for Tesla. He is known for designing Tesla vehicles, including the Model S, Model 3, Model X, Model Y, Semi, and the unveiled but not-yet-released Cybertruck, and second-generation Tesla Roadster.

Personal life
Franz von Holzhausen is married to Vicki von Holzhausen, a designer who runs the "" fashion label focused on vegan leather products that are made from plant-based materials.

References

External links

1968 births
Living people
American people of German descent
American automobile designers
General Motors designers
Volkswagen Group designers
Mazda
Tesla, Inc. people
Native American people